Ntoroko District is a district in the Western Region of Uganda. The district headquarters are in the Kibbuuku town council. It is the second least populated district in Uganda.

Location

Ntoroko District is one of the two Ugandan districts west of the Rwenzori Mountains, the other being Bundibugyo District. The Ntoroko District is bordered by the Democratic Republic of the Congo to the west and north, separated by the winding Semuliki River, has a maritime boundary with two Bunyoro districts; Kikuube District to the north-north-east and Kagadi District to the north-east. Kabarole District to the south and east, and Bundibugyo District to the south. The town of Ntoroko (officially Kanara Town Council is approximately 84 km north-west of Fort Portal City, the regional capital by road, 111 from Bundibugyo and

Overview
The Ntoroko District was created by the Ugandan Parliament and became operational on 1 July 2010. Before that, the district was part of the Bundibugyo District.

Population
In 1991, the national population census estimated the district population at 24,300. The national census in 2002 estimated the population at 51,100. In 2014, the national census and household survey enumerated the district population at 67,005.

See also
 Districts of Uganda
 Rwenzori sub-region

References

External links
  Ntoroko District Information Portal

 
Rwenzururu sub-region
Districts of Uganda
Western Region, Uganda